is a Japanese manga series written and illustrated by Aako Fujiwara. It was serialized in Shogakukan's seinen manga magazine Monthly Big Comic Spirits from March 2017 to November 2020.

Publication
Written and illustrated by Aako Fujiwara, Kimajime-hime to Bunbōgu-ōji was serialized in Shogakukan's seinen manga magazine Monthly Big Comic Spirits from March 27, 2017, to November 27, 2020. Shogakukan collected its chapters in five tankōbon volumes, released from May 12, 2017, to March 12, 2021.

In Indonesia, the manga has been licensed by Elex Media Komputindo.

Volume list

References

External links
 

Seinen manga
Shogakukan manga